The "Original 33" were the first 33 African-American members of the Georgia General Assembly. They were elected to office in 1868, during the Reconstruction era. They were among the first African-American state legislators in the United States. Twenty-four of the members were ministers. Upon taking office, white Democrats, then a minority in the Assembly, conspired with enough white Republicans to expel the African-American legislators from the Assembly in September 1868. The next year, the Supreme Court of Georgia ruled that African Americans had the right to hold office in Georgia. The expelled legislators were reinstated and took office in January 1870.

The 33 are commemorated in the sculpture Expelled Because of Color on the grounds of the Georgia State Capitol.

History

Elections in Georgia in 1868 were plagued by widespread Ku Klux Klan violence aimed at murdering or intimidating newly freed African Americans. Freedmen's Bureau officials in Georgia counted 336 cases of murder or assault with intent to kill against freedmen between January 1 and November 15. Still, 33 African Americans — 30 in the lower house, 3 in the state senate — were able to be elected in heavily Black areas, making up about one-sixth of the 197-member legislature.

After losing votes for their preferred candidates for the U.S. Senate, the white majority conspired to remove the black and mixed-ethnicity members from the Assembly on the grounds they were ineligible to hold office under the Georgia Constitution. Most of the black delegates to the state's post-war constitutional convention voted against including into the constitution the right of black legislators to hold office, a vote which Rep. Henry McNeal Turner came to regret.

The members were expelled by September 1868. The ex-legislators petitioned the federal government and state courts to intervene. In White v. Clements (June 1869), the Supreme Court of Georgia ruled 2-1 that black people did, in fact, have a right to hold office in Georgia. In January 1870, commanding general of the District of Georgia Alfred H. Terry began "Terry's Purge", removing ex-Confederates in the General Assembly who had been elected through election violence or intimidation. He replaced them with Republican runners-up and reinstated the black legislators, resulting in a Republican majority in both houses. From that point, the General Assembly accomplished the ratification of the 15th Amendment, chose new senators to go to Washington, and adopted public education.

The work of the Republican majority was short-lived, after the so-called "Redeemer" Democrats won majorities in both houses in December 1870. The Republican governor, Rufus Bullock, after trying and failing to reinstate federal military rule in Georgia, fled the state. After the Democrats took office they began to enact harsh recriminations against Republicans and African Americans, using terror, intimidation, and the Ku Klux Klan, leading to disenfranchisement by the 1890s. One quarter of the black legislators were killed, threatened, beaten, or jailed. The last African-American legislator, William H. Rogers, resigned in 1907. Afterwards, no African American held a seat in the Georgia legislature until civil rights attorney Leroy Johnson, a Democrat, was elected to the state senate in 1962.

List of legislators
At that time, each state senator in Georgia represented a single-member district made up of three contiguous counties, numbered from 1 to 44. Population was not considered when drawing state senate districts. Each state representative in Georgia represented a county, with counties having between one and three representatives depending on population.

Representatives
Eli Barnes, Hancock County
James Ward Porter, Chatham County
Henry McNeal Turner, Bibb County
William Guilford, Upson County
William Henry Harrison, Hancock County
 Thomas M. Allen, Jasper County
 Thomas Beard, Richmond County
 Edwin Belcher, Wilkes County
 George H. Clower, Monroe County
 Abram Colby, Greene County
 Romulus Moore, Columbia County
 John T. Costin, Talbot County
 Madison Davis, Clarke County
 Monday Floyd, Morgan County
 F. H. Fyall, Macon County
 Samuel Gardner, Warren County
 William A. Golden, Liberty County
 Ulysses L. Houston, Bryan County
 James M. Simms, Chatham County
 Philip Joiner, Dougherty County
 George Linder, Laurens County
 Robert Lumpkin, Macon County
 Peter O'Neal, Baldwin County
 Alfred Richardson, Clarke County
 Alexander Stone, Jefferson County
 Abraham Smith, Muscogee County
 John Warren, Burke County
 Samuel Williams, Harris County
 Tunis Campbell Jr., McIntosh County
 Malcolm Claiborn, Burke County

State Senators
 Rev. Tunis Campbell Sr., of McIntosh County, who also represented Liberty and Tattnall counties. These counties comprised District 2.
 Aaron Alpeoria Bradley, of Chatham, who also represented Bryan and Effingham counties. These counties comprised District 1.
 George Wallace, who represented Hancock, Baldwin, and Washington counties. These counties comprised District 20.

Recognition
In 1976, the Original 33 were honored by the Black Caucus of the Georgia General Assembly with a statue that depicts the rise of African-American politicians. It is on the grounds of the Georgia State Capitol in Atlanta.

Inscribed on the base of Riddle's sculpture are the names of the 33 black pioneer legislators of the Georgia General Assembly elected and expelled in 1868 and reinstated in 1870 by an Act of Congress.

The Georgia Legislative Black Caucus continues to hold annual events honoring the Original 33.

References

 
Georgia General Assembly
African-American history of Georgia (U.S. state)
History of racism in Georgia (U.S. state)
African-American state legislators in Georgia (U.S. state)
Racially motivated violence against African Americans
1868 in Georgia (U.S. state)